Indian Trails Middle School may refer to one of two public schools within the U.S. state of Florida.

 Indian Trails Middle School (Seminole County), a school in Winter Springs
 Indian Trails Middle School (Flagler County), a school in Palm Coast

See Also 
Indian Trail School (disambiguation)